The Tibetan horn or dungchen is a long trumpet or horn used in Tibetan Buddhist and Mongolian buddhist ceremonies. It is the most widely used instrument in Tibetan Buddhist culture. It is often played in pairs or multiples, and the sound is compared to the singing of elephants. Tsultrim Allione described the sound:It is a long, deep, whirring, haunting wail that takes you out somewhere beyond the highest Himalaya peaks and at the same time back into your mother's womb.

See also
Music of Tibet
Alphorn
Erke

References

External links
Movie about making Tibetan horns in Nepal
Scientific Movie on the sound characteristics, history and notation

Tibetan Buddhist art and culture
Tibetan musical instruments
Natural horns and trumpets